Palladium(II) bis(acetylacetonate) is a compound with formula Pd(C5H7O2)2. This yellow solid is the most common palladium complex of acetylacetonate. This compound is commercially available and used as a catalyst precursor in organic synthesis. The molecule is relatively planar with idealized D2h symmetry.

See also
 Platinum(II) bis(acetylacetonate)
 Nickel(II) bis(acetylacetonate)

References

Palladium compounds
Acetylacetonate complexes
Catalysts